The Closing of Winterland is a four-CD live album by the Grateful Dead.  It contains the complete concert performed on December 31, 1978. The concert was also released as a two-disc DVD. The title derives from the fact that it was the last concert in San Francisco's Winterland Arena, which was shut down shortly thereafter. The Dead celebrated the closing as an approximately five-hour-long party (complete with breakfast with the audience at dawn) and invited some guests including guitarist John Cipollina of Quicksilver Messenger Service and Ken Kesey as well as actor Dan Aykroyd who provided the midnight countdown.  It was certified Double Platinum by the RIAA on December 15, 2003 under the category of longform video, selling 200,000 units.  The New Riders of the Purple Sage and Blues Brothers opened the show.

Pre-ordered DVD sets included the bonus CD "New Year's Eves at Winterland".  It contains an additional nine tracks recorded on New Year's Eve in 1970, 1971, 1972 and 1977.

Track listing

Disc one 
First set:
 "Sugar Magnolia" > (Bob Weir, Robert Hunter) – 7:21
 "Scarlet Begonias" > (Jerry Garcia, Hunter) – 11:55
 "Fire on the Mountain" (Mickey Hart, Hunter) – 15:05
 "Me and My Uncle" (John Phillips) – 3:11
 "Big River" (Johnny Cash) – 7:05
 "Friend of the Devil" (Garcia, John Dawson, Hunter) – 10:48
 "It's All Over Now" (Bobby Womack, Shirley Womack) – 8:23
 "Stagger Lee" (Garcia, Hunter) – 8:03
 "From the Heart of Me" > (Donna Godchaux) – 3:49
 "Sunshine Daydream" (Weir, Hunter) – 3:15

Disc two 
Second set:
 "Samson and Delilah" (traditional, arranged by Weir) – 9:17
 "Ramble On Rose" (Garcia, Hunter) – 9:35
 "I Need a Miracle" > (Weir, John Barlow) – 11:19
 "Terrapin Station" > (Garcia, Hunter) – 12:23
 "Playing in the Band" > (Weir, Hart, Hunter) – 13:06

Disc three 
Second set, continued:
 "Rhythm Devils" > (Hart, Bill Kreutzmann) – 19:23
 "Not Fade Away" > (Norman Petty, Buddy Holly) – 19:34
 "Around and Around" (Chuck Berry) – 9:19

Disc four 
Third set:
 "Dark Star" > (Garcia, Hart, Kreutzmann, Phil Lesh, Ron "Pigpen" McKernan, Weir, Hunter) – 11:53
 "The Other One" > (Weir, Kreutzmann) – 4:55
 "Dark Star" > (Garcia, Hart, Kreutzmann, Lesh, McKernan, Weir, Hunter) – 1:09
 "Wharf Rat" > (Garcia, Hunter) – 11:08
 "St. Stephen" > (Garcia, Lesh, Hunter) – 7:52
 "Good Lovin''" (Rudy Clark, Arthur Resnick) – 13:57
First encore:
 "Casey Jones" > (Garcia, Hunter) – 5:17
 "Johnny B. Goode" (Berry) – 7:14
Second encore:
 "And We Bid You Goodnight" (traditional, arranged by Grateful  Dead) – 4:13

Bonus disc – "New Year's Eves at Winterland" 
Recordings from other New Year's Eve concerts at Winterland:
 "Easy Wind" (Hunter) – 9:35 (December 31, 1970)  
 "Jam" > (Grateful Dead) – 2:07 (December 31, 1971)
 "Black Peter" (Garcia, Hunter) – 8:42 (December 31, 1971)
 "Playing in the Band" (Weir, Hart, Hunter) – 18:26 (December 31, 1972)  
 "Lazy Lightning" > (Weir, Barlow) – 3:36  (December 31, 1977)
 "Supplication" (Weir, Barlow) – 5:35 (December 31, 1977)
 "Sugar Magnolia" (Weir, Hunter) – 11:59 (December 31, 1977)
 "Scarlet Begonias" > (Garcia, Hunter) – 8:48 (December 31, 1977)
 "Fire on the Mountain" (Hart, Hunter) – 10:06 (December 31, 1977)

DVD
The DVD version of The Closing of Winterland contains the video of the New Year's Eve show, with stereo and 5.1 surround sound audio options.  It also includes some related bonus material. According to the bonus DVD, the concert was recorded on 2-inch quad video, considered the best quality at the time, and also on 24-track audio tape.

Disc one 
Concert – first set
Concert – second set

Disc two 
Concert – third set
"Winterland: A Million Memories" documentary film
The Blues Brothers – "Soul Man" and "B Movie"
New Riders of the Purple Sage – "Glendale Train"
"Making of the DVD" featurette with David Lemieux and Jeffrey Norman
"2 AM" interview with Bob Weir, Mickey Hart, and Ken Kesey
Bill Graham interview by Scoop Nisker
"Grateful Dead at Winterland" chronological history

Personnel 
Grateful Dead
 Jerry Garcia – guitar, vocals
 Bob Weir – guitar, vocals
 Phil Lesh – electric bass, vocals
 Donna Godchaux – vocals
 Keith Godchaux – piano
 Mickey Hart – drums, percussion
 Bill Kreutzmann – drums, percussion

Additional musicians
 Bill Graham – master of ceremonies
 Dan Aykroyd – midnight countdown
 John Cipollina – guitar
 Ken Kesey – thunder machine
 Matthew Kelly – harmonica
 Lee Oskar – harmonica
 Greg Errico – drums

Production
 David Lemieux – producer
 Jeffrey Norman – producer, mixing
 Eileen Law – archival research
 Stanley Mouse – cover art
 Alton Kelley – cover art
 Ed Perlstein – photography
 Michael Zagaris  –  additional photography
 Steve Schneider –  additional photography
 Robert Minkin – package design and production
 Gary Lambert – liner notes
 Glenn Lambert – liner notes

Notes 

Grateful Dead live albums
2003 live albums
Rhino Records live albums